Germany was represented by Heidi Brühl, with the song "Marcel", at the 1963 Eurovision Song Contest, which took place on 23 March in London. Brühl was selected internally as the German performer, and the song was chosen at the national final on 28 February. Brühl had previously finished runner-up in the German national final in 1960, but her song "Wir wollen niemals auseinandergehn" had gone on to become one of the biggest hits of the year, topping the German singles chart for several weeks.

Before Eurovision

National final
The final was held at the TV studios in Frankfurt. Brühl performed five songs and the winner was chosen by postcard voting. "Marcel" was a runaway winner, receiving almost two-thirds of all votes cast.

At Eurovision 
On the night of the final Brühl performed third in the running order, following the Netherlands and preceding Austria. Voting was by each national jury awarding 5-4-3-2-1 to their top 5 songs, and at the close "Marcel" had received 5 points (3 from Monaco and 2 from Norway), placing Germany 9th of the 16 entries. The German jury awarded its 5 points to Monaco.

Voting

References 

1963
Countries in the Eurovision Song Contest 1963
1963